Cəngan (also, Dzhalyan-Sal’yany and Dzhangyan) is a village in the Neftchala Rayon of Azerbaijan.  The village forms part of the municipality of Ərəbqardaşbəyli.

References 

Populated places in Neftchala District